Necklace Road railway station is a railway station in Hyderabad, Telangana, India. Localities like Minister Road, Raj Bhavan, Somajiguda and Necklace Road are accessible from this station.

Lines
Hyderabad Multi-Modal Transport System
 – Nampally (Hyderabad) (SH Line)

External links
MMTS Timings as per South Central Railway

MMTS stations in Hyderabad